Lydia Moyer is a contemporary video and print artist who works primarily with themes of feminism, the environment, and history. She often appropriates existing materials and objects and blurs the premise of non-fiction. Her work has been featured a number of national and international exhibitions. Aside from her artwork, Moyer also works as a professor at the University of Virginia (UVA).

Early life 
Moyer received her BFA at the New York State School of Art and Design at Alfred in 1999. In 2005, Moyer received her MFA in studio practice at UNC Chapel Hill.

Career 
After receiving her BFA, Moyer taught community documentary at Appalshop in Appalachian Kentucky. She began teaching at UVA in 2006.

Moyer's art is primarily video and print art. In an interview with Kiana Williams for Iris Magazine, a feminist magazine, at the University of Virginia, Moyer described her art making process as though it is her “job to distill personal experience or interest into something that other people can understand or from which they can get something, whether it be a feeling, an insight, a question, anything.”

Artwork 
Much of Moyer's work deals with the environmental and social issues that she describes as "the shadow of capitalism." Her video series The Forcing, for instance, deals directly with themes of environmental degradation and state violence, relying heavily on sound to connect benign images of nature with sometimes disturbing footage of current events. Deer, commonly associated with femininity, play a crucial role in many of Moyer's pieces.

In an earlier piece, Paradise, a feature-length video, Moyer investigates the relationship between culture and nature. In this piece, Moyer visits iconic locations where tragedies or disasters took place such as the Ninth Ward in New Orleans. The absence of people throughout the videos conveys the starkness of the landscapes which were once sensationalized, but now largely forgotten about. The goal of the piece is to encourage the view to experience the event again in a new light, while viewers without prior knowledge can create their own narratives. The piece plays with contrast in the relationship between the viewer and their preconceptions of a sensationalized tragedy as well as the relationship between evidence of human society in the natural landscape

Art projects

Videos 
 Paradise (2011)
 The Teardrinkers at the Crow’s Nest (2013)
 Comet Song (2015)
 The Forcing (2015)
 Paradise (2015)
 The Forcing (no. 2) (2015)
 study for unsettling (2016)
 The Forcing (no. 4) (2016)
 Terre Nullius (2016)
 moments of silence (2016)
 Solstice (2017)
 Theforcing (no.6) (2017)

Books 
 vault (2010)
 real estate (2011)
 Deerstains (2011)
 bounty (2011)
 The Unabomber’s Wife (2011)
 Listy Silver (2015)
 The Unabomber’s Ex-Wife (2017)

Other projects 
 Hateful (2015)

Exhibitions

Solo and two-person exhibitions 
 (2016) Athens Film Festival, Athens, OH, Paradise 
 (2016) Viking Cinema, Fjúk Arts Centre, Húsavík, Iceland, Paradise
 (2014) The Box, Wexner Center for the Arts, Columbus, OH, Tar Creek
 (2012) The Crow's NestPreserve, National Lands Trust, Warwick, PA, The Teardrinkers
 (2010) Lump Projects, Raleigh, NC, Black Damp

Group exhibitions and group screenings 
 (2017) Plecto Espacio de Arte Contemporáneo, Medellin, Colombia, Frame & Frequency
 (2017) Knockdown Center, Queens, New York, Nasty Women
 (2016) Les Recontres Internationales, Gaîté Lyrique, Paris, Frances, Post-Traumatique
 (2013) Center for Book and Paper, Columbia College, Chicago, IL, DIY (visits Chicago)
 (2012) Holmfirth Arts Festival, Towser Zine Library, Holmfirth, West Yorkshire, England
 (2010) UN Climate Change Conference, Cancun, Mexico, Two Degrees of Separation

References 

Year of birth missing (living people)
Place of birth missing (living people)
Living people
American contemporary artists
University of North Carolina alumni
University of Virginia faculty